The Prisoner is a 1955 British black and white psychological thriller film directed by Peter Glenville and based on the play by Bridget Boland. The film stars Alec Guinness and Jack Hawkins. Although controversial upon release, the film did go on to be nominated for five 1956 British Academy Awards: best film, best actor (for Hawkins and Guinness), best director, and best adapted screenplay.

Plot
The film is set in post-war years, in an unnamed European country where communist tyranny has recently replaced Nazi tyranny (presumably East Germany), a Cardinal (Alec Guinness) is falsely accused of treason. The Cardinal had withstood torture when he opposed the Nazis, so the regime knows it will not be able to use force to get him to make a false confession. The Interrogator (Jack Hawkins), an old associate of the Cardinal's but now a Communist, is given the task of persuading him to make a public confession. He intends to do it by undermining the Cardinal's certainty in the righteousness of his resistance to the state.

A great part of the story is allocated to the daily conversations between the Cardinal and the lowly jailer (Wilfrid Lawson) who brings him food. They philosophise about religion and politics.

At first the Interrogator makes no progress. This leads the state authorities to grow impatient and try to trick the Cardinal with fake evidence. The Cardinal is easily able to deal with these clumsy attempts, which leave the state prosecutors humiliated. The Interrogator uses sleep deprivation, relentless questioning, and the deliberate upsetting of the Cardinal’s eating and sleep/wake patterns to weaken him. He eventually breaks the Cardinal's will by showing him he became a priest out of selfishness and vanity and to escape his childhood poverty, not out of goodness, virtue or benevolence, which everyone (including the Cardinal himself) has always believed. To purge his sin, in the show trial that follows, the Cardinal confesses to every lie of which he is accused but asks God, rather than the court, for forgiveness. After this, the interrogator discusses the possible impact of this on the public and the Cardinal is released to face a silent, bewildered crowd. This is done to avoid him becoming a martyr.

There is a sub-plot about a young warder (Ronald Lewis) who is in love with a married woman  (Jeannette Sterke), who wants to leave the country to join her husband.

Cast
 Alec Guinness as The Cardinal
 Jack Hawkins as The Interrogator
 Wilfrid Lawson as The Jailer
 Kenneth Griffith as The Secretary
 Jeanette Sterke as The Girl
 Ronald Lewis as The Guard
 Raymond Huntley as The General
 Mark Dignam as The Governor
 Gerard Heinz as The Doctor

Production
The Cardinal was based on Croatian cardinal Aloysius Stepinac (1898–1960), who was a defendant in a show trial in Croatia (as a result of the similarities, the film couldn't be shown in Yugoslavia until the fall of the communist government) and on Hungarian cardinal József Mindszenty (1892–1975), who was charged in Hungary.  The film was shot in England and Belgium (at Ostend and Bruges).

Reception
The film was controversial. It was seen as "pro-Communist" by some in Ireland; while in France, where the film was prohibited from being shown at Cannes, the film was labelled "anti-Communist". Likewise it was banned from the Venice Film Festival due to its being considered "so anti-Communist that it would be offensive to Communist countries". Some in Italy saw it as "anti-Catholic",  but despite this the film was given an award by the International Catholic Office of the Cinema, and commended by Cardinal Griffin.

The Radio Times, while praising the two main performances, wrote, "Peter Glenville's theatrical direction won't do much to persuade those without religious or political convictions to become involved". TV Guide wrote, "basically a photographed stage play, and although there are a few other actors, Hawkins and Guinness are centre stage most of the time—their mano a mano a delight to watch. Director Glenville had to use all of his expertise to keep the film from being little more than talking heads but his touch is sure".

The New York Times called The Prisoner a "grim and gripping drama—which also happens to be an equally revealing motion picture, one of the best of the year... film that will make you shiver—and think."

References

External links

1955 films
1955 drama films
British drama films
Films directed by Peter Glenville
Films scored by Benjamin Frankel
Films shot at Pinewood Studios
Films critical of communism
Columbia Pictures films
1955 directorial debut films
1950s English-language films
1950s British films
British black-and-white films